Samuel Lawry (22 August 1854–26 July 1933) was a New Zealand Methodist minister and administrator. He was born in St Mabyn, Cornwall, England on 22 August 1854.

References

1854 births
1933 deaths
English emigrants to New Zealand
New Zealand Methodist ministers